Alan Fine may refer to:

 Alan Fine (executive) (born 1951), American President of Marvel Entertainment
 Alan Fine (writer) (born 1953), author, executive coach, consultant, and speaker